Bakhtegan County is in Fars province, Iran. The capital of the county is the city of Abadeh Tashk. At the 2006 census, the region's population (as Abadeh Tashk District of Neyriz County) was 28,664 in 7,008 households. The following census in 2011 counted 32,327 people in 8,664 households. At the 2016 census the district's population was 32,224 in 9,966 households. Abadeh Tashk District was separated from Neyriz County in 2018 to become Bakhtegan County.

Administrative divisions

The population history of Bakhtegan County's administrative divisions (as Abadeh Tashk District) over three consecutive censuses is shown in the following table.

References

Counties of Fars Province